Events during the year 1105 in Italy.

Deaths
 Dagobert of Pisa
 Peter of Anagni
 Simon of Sicily

Births
 Pope Alexander III
 Henry Aristippus

Sources

 Alexander of Telese, The Deeds Done by King Roger of Sicily.
 
 Myriam Soria Audebert, "Pontifical Propaganda during the Schisms: Alexander III to the reconquest of Church Unity," in Convaincre et persuader: Communication et propagande aux XII et XIIIe siècles. Ed. par Martin Aurell. Poitiers: Université de Poitiers-centre d'études supérieures de civilisation médiévale, 2007,
Hugo Falcandus. History of the Tyrants of Sicily at the Latin Library.
Norwich, John Julius. The Kingdom in the Sun 1130-1194. Longman: London, 1970.
Matthew, Donald. The Norman Kingdom of Sicily. Cambridge University Press: 1992.
Houben, Hubert. Roger II of Sicily: A Ruler between East and West. Trans. G. A. Loud and Diane Milbourne. Cambridge University Press: 2002.

Years of the 12th century in Italy
Italy
Italy